John Robert Lewendon Maddicott,  (born  22 July 1943) is an English historian who has published works on the political and social history of England in the 13th and 14th centuries, and has also written a number of leading articles on the Anglo-Saxon economy, his second area of interest. 

Born in Exeter, Devon, he was educated at Worcester College, Oxford. He has written a biography of Thomas, 2nd Earl of Lancaster, and one on Simon de Montfort, 6th Earl of Leicester. In Hilary term 2004, he delivered the Ford Lectures, the most prestigious history lectures in Oxford University, on the topic of the genesis of the English Parliament.
He taught at the University of Manchester and was a fellow and tutor in history at Exeter College, Oxford, from 1969 until 2006. An elected Fellow of the British Academy (FBA), he was also joint editor of the English Historical Review from 1990 to 2000. In 2001 he delivered the British Academy's Raleigh Lecture on History.

Selected publications
Thomas of Lancaster, 1307-22: A Study in the Reign of Edward II. (Oxford, 1970) 
"The English Peasantry and the Demands of the Crown, 1294-1341", Past and Present. Vol Supplement No. 1 (1975)
"Trade, Industry and the Wealth of King Alfred", Past and Present. Vol 123 (1989) 
Simon de Montfort. (Cambridge, 1994); pbk reprint
 'An Infinite Multitude of Nobles': Quality, Quantity and Politics in the Pre-Reform Parliaments of Henry III, in Thirteenth Century England, vii (1999), pp. 17–46
"Power and prosperity in the Age of Bede and Beowulf", Proceedings of the British Academy. (2002)
The Origins of the English Parliament, 924-1327. (Oxford, 2010)

References

External links
Old home page at Exeter College
Current version of the home page at Exeter College
The Origins of the English Parliament, 924-1327 available on Amazon

1943 births
Living people
English historians
Alumni of Worcester College, Oxford
Fellows of Exeter College, Oxford
English male non-fiction writers
Fellows of the British Academy